Anna Andreevna Vereshchak (born 18 July 2001) is a Russian handball player who plays for Dinamo Volgograd in the Russian Super League.

In September 2018, she was included by EHF in a list of the twenty best young handballers to watch for the future.

Achievements
Youth World Championship:
Gold Medalist: 2018

Individual awards  
 All-Star Goalkeeper of the Youth World Championship: 2018
 All-Star Goalkeeper of the Junior European Championship: 2019

References
 

2001 births
Living people 
Russian female handball players
Sportspeople from Volgograd